Selga Penelope Vitmore (born 10 March 2002) is a Latvian footballer who plays as a midfielder for Super Nova and the Latvia national team.

International career
Vitmore made her debut for the Latvia national team on 30 November 2021, coming on as a substitute for her club teammate Alise Gaiķe against England.

References

2002 births
Living people
Women's association football midfielders
Latvian women's footballers
Latvia women's international footballers